Masquerade is a 1941 Soviet drama film directed by Sergei Gerasimov and based on the eponymous play by Mikhail Lermontov. Its release was timed for the centenary of Lermontov's death.

Cast 
 Nikolay Mordvinov as Arbenin
 Tamara Makarova as Nina
 Mikhail Sadovsky as Knyaz Zvezdich 
 Sofiya Magarill as Baroness Shtral 
 Antonin Pankryshev as Kazarin 
 Emil Gal as Shprikh
 Sergei Gerasimov as Unknown man

References

External links 

1941 drama films
1941 films
Soviet black-and-white films
Soviet drama films
Soviet films based on plays
1940s Russian-language films